Wirreanda Creek is an ephemeral watercourse in the Far North region of South Australia. The flows ultimately end up crossing through the Flinders Ranges into Lake Torrens via Willochra Creek.

See also

References

Rivers of South Australia
Flinders Ranges